Jazz and Jailbirds is a 1919 American silent comedy film featuring Oliver Hardy.

Cast
 Jimmy Aubrey as Jimmy
 Oliver Hardy as I.M. Ruff (as Babe Hardy)
 Richard Smith as Thief (as Dick Smith)
 Dorothy Vernon
 Dorothea Wolbert
 Jess Weldon as Fat Man

See also
 List of American films of 1919
 Oliver Hardy filmography

External links

1919 films
1919 short films
American silent short films
American black-and-white films
1919 comedy films
Silent American comedy films
American comedy short films
1910s American films